General  Hamilton Wanasinghe, VSV (born 1935) was a Full General in the Sri Lanka Army. He served as the 11th Commander of the Sri Lankan Army (1988–1991), third general officer commanding (GOC) of the Joint Operations Headquarters (JOH) (at present referred to as the Chief of the Defence Staff) (1991–1993) and Defense Secretary.

Early life
Hamilton Wanasinghe was born in Malwana, a suburb of Colombo. He received his primary and secondary education at Ananda College. A keen sportsman, he was the sergeant major in the college cadet platoon. He was also an active member of the College rifle shooting team, which won many coveted trophies and then later, he joined the army. Wanasinghe also represented Ceylon Inter Dominion small bore rifle shooting competition.

Military career

Early career
He joined Ceylon Army as an officer cadet in 1954 and was sent to the Royal Military Academy Sandhurst for officer training. On completing his training he was commissioned as second lieutenant in the Ceylon Artillery in 1955. He was a captain in the 3rd Field Artillery Regiment when the 1962 attempt coup took place. Many of the officers of the three regiments of the Ceylon Artillery were implicated and Captain Wanasinghe gave evidence in the Trail-at-Bar of the accused that followed. He was transferred to the 4th Field Artillery Regiment following the amalgamation of the 1st Light Anti-Aircraft Regiment and the 3rd Field Artillery Regiment in 1963. He went on to serve the commanding officer of the 4th Field Artillery Regiment with the rank of lieutenant colonel from May 1979 to 1981.

Higher command
Promoted to colonel, he served as Commander, Task Force 4 Northern Command in Jaffna from January 1981 to December 1981. In 1982 he attended the National Defence College, India and on his return he was promoted to brigadier. Promoted to major general, he served as the first colonel commandant, Sri Lanka Artillery, from September 1985 to March 1988 and thereafter served as the Commandant of the Volunteer Force.

Army Commander
He was appointed as the Army Commander on 15 August 1988 and served until 15 November 1991 and was promoted to the rank of lieutenant general. When Wanasinghe took command the army was engaged in subduing 2nd JVP insurrection in the south of the island, while the Indian Peace Keeping Force (IPKF) was present in North and East of Sri Lanka. General Wanasinghe had the unprecedented task of maintaining cordial relations in a turbulent period. During his tenure he expanded the army and raised number of new units including special forces and established its sniper school, the army was able to crush the JVP leadership and insurrection completely, while it was able to recapture the Eastern Province and allow the elections to be held in the Eastern Province. The army carriedout several major operations in the Northern Province, including Operation Balavegaya to relive the siege of Elephant  Pass Army base through an amphibious operation and established a beach head at Vettalikerni to reach Elephant Pass camp. Indian Defence Review in 1991 reported that "Army Commander Lt Gen Hamilton Wanasinghe visited the battlefield frequently and narrowly escaped being killed. " Lt.General Hamilton Wanasinghe as the Commander of the Army risked his own life and was present at Elephant Pass rescue operation Balawegaya  along with Major General Denzil Kobbekaduwa and Task Force Commander Late Brigadier Vijaya Wimalaratne. Operation Balavegaya was launched in June 1991 with assistance of Sri Lanka Navy with an amphibious landing at Vetterlerkani which LTTE leader called it "Mother of All Battles". Victorious Sri Lanka Army troops broke the LTTE siege at Elephant Pass.

Joint Operations Headquarters
On relinquishment of the Commander of Army on 15 November 1991 he was promoted to the rank of general and appointed as the general officer commanding (GOC) of the Joint Operations Headquarters (JOH) serving from 1991 to 1993.

Ministry of Defence
Thereafter he was appointed Permanent Secretary of the Ministry of Defence on 6 June 1993 from which position he retired in February 1995. He had a rare distinction of holding all three key appointments of the Sri Lanka's Defence establishment at a time country faced southern JVP insurrection and LTTE Second  Ealam War. In November 1993 General Hamilton Wanasinghe facilitated the relief operation during the Battle of Pooneryn with an amphibious landing of Army troops assisted by the Navy.

Honors
He had been awarded the Vishista Seva Vibhushanaya (VSV) for distinguished service in the army, his other medals include the Purna Bhumi Padakkama, Vadamarachchi Operation Medal, Sri Lanka Armed Services Long Service Medal, Ceylon Armed Services Long Service Medal, Republic of Sri Lanka Armed Services Medal and the President's Inauguration Medal.

In 2019, road in between his hometown Malwana and Dompe was named General Hamilton Wanasinghe Mawatha.

Family
He married Ira Beatrice Jayathillake, daughter of Wanasinghe Arachchige Elaris Perera Jayathillake Ralahamy, a close relative in 1960. Ira Wanasinghe was a school teacher, and they had five children. His son Sanjaya Wanasinghe was commissioned as a Second Lieutenant in the Sri Lanka Artillery when Wanasinghe was the Army Commander and became Major General of Sri Lankan Army.

Two of Hamilton Wanasinghe's nephews were killed in action serving in the Sri Lanka Artillery in 1993; Captain Nalin Jayatilleke (his wife's brother's son) was killed serving as forward observation officer in Jaffna and Major Panduka Wanasinghe (his elder brother's son) was killed in the Battle of Pooneryn. His son-in-law (and a nephew) Brigadier Bhathiya Jayatilleka was killed in 2000 during the Second Battle of Elephant Pass.

See also
List of Sri Lankan non-career Permanent Secretaries

References 

 Stolen stripes and broken medals by Muhammed Anver
 http://www.asiantribune.com/news/2010/10/30/sri-lanka%E2%80%99s-high-court-sentences-hicorp-director-five-years-ri
 http://www.ceylontoday.lk/15543-print.html
 http://www.sundayobserver.lk/2010/07/11/sec03.asp
 Indian Defence Review -1991
 Asiaweek – Volume 17, Issues 27-51 – Page lxxix
 CeylonToday -18.08.2017

External links 
  I SAID, ‘I AM THE ARMY COMMANDER NOT YOU’
  Prabhakaran’s Tigers and Mandela’s Spears 
 The Sandhurst Collection

 

Sri Lankan full generals
Sinhalese military personnel
Commanders of the Sri Lanka Army
People from Colombo
Graduates of the Royal Military Academy Sandhurst
Alumni of Ananda College
Permanent secretaries of Sri Lanka
Living people
1935 births
Sri Lanka Artillery officers
National Defence College, India alumni
People of the Sri Lankan Civil War
Indian Peace Keeping Force